The 2010 NCAA Division II football season, part of college football in the United States organized by the National Collegiate Athletic Association at the Division II level, began on September 4, 2010, and concluded with the NCAA Division II Football Championship on December 18, 2010 at Braly Municipal Stadium in Florence, Alabama, hosted by the University of North Alabama. The Minnesota–Duluth Bulldogs defeated the Delta State Statesmen, 20–17, to win their second Division II national title.

The Harlon Hill Trophy was awarded to Eric Czerniewski, quarterback from Central Missouri.

Conference and program changes

Lincoln (PA) and Urbana completed their transitions to Division II and became eligible for the postseason.

Conference standings

Super Region 1

Super Region 2

Super Region 3

Super Region 4

Conference summaries

Postseason

The 2010 NCAA Division II Football Championship playoffs were the 37th single-elimination tournament to determine the national champion of men's NCAA Division II college football. The championship game was held at Braly Municipal Stadium in Florence, Alabama for the 23rd time.

Seeded teams
Albany State
Abilene Christian
Augustana
Delta State
Kutztown
Mercyhurst
Minnesota–Duluth
Texas A&M–Kingsville

Playoff bracket

* Home team    † Overtime

See also
 2010 NCAA Division I FBS football season
 2010 NCAA Division I FCS football season
 2010 NCAA Division III football season
 2010 NAIA football season

References